Nikolaus Ott (born 9 July 1945) is a competition rower and Olympic champion for West Germany.

Ott won a gold medal in coxed eights at the 1968 Summer Olympics in Mexico City, as a member of the rowing team from West Germany.

References

1945 births
Olympic rowers of West Germany
Rowers at the 1968 Summer Olympics
Olympic gold medalists for West Germany
Living people
Olympic medalists in rowing
West German male rowers
Medalists at the 1968 Summer Olympics